Turn-On is an American sketch comedy series that aired on ABC in February 1969. Only one episode was shown, leaving one episode unaired, and the show is considered one of the most infamous flops in TV history.

Turn-Ons sole broadcast episode was shown on Wednesday, February 5, 1969, at 8:30 pm ET, replacing the Wednesday episode of Peyton Place. Among the cast were Teresa Graves (who would join the Laugh-In cast that fall), Hamilton Camp, and Chuck McCann. The writing staff included Albert Brooks. The guest host for the first episode was Tim Conway, who also participated in certain sketches.

Background
The show was created by Ed Friendly and George Schlatter, the producers of Rowan & Martin's Laugh-In. Bristol-Myers contracted with them to develop the show, and provided it to ABC for a projected 13-week run after NBC and CBS rejected it. 

One CBS official confessed, "It was so fast with the cuts and chops that some of our people actually got physically disturbed by it." Production executive Digby Wolfe described it as a "visual, comedic, sensory assault involving animation, videotape, stop-action film, electronic distortion, computer graphics—even people."

Premise
Turn-On'''s premise was that it was produced by a computer. Distinguishing characteristics of the show were its use of the Moog synthesizer and lack of sets, except for a white backdrop. Unlike Laugh-In, Turn-On "focused almost exclusively on sex as a comedic subject", using various rapid-fire jokes and risqué skits, but no laugh track. The program was also filmed instead of presented live or on videotape. Several of the jokes were presented with the screen divided into four squares resembling comic strip panels. The production credits of the episode appeared after each commercial break, instead of conventionally at the beginning or end.

Reaction
Tim Conway has stated that Turn-On was canceled midway through its only episode, so that the party that the cast and crew held for its premiere as the show aired across the United States also marked its cancellation. Cleveland, Ohio's WEWS-TV did not return to the show after the first commercial break which Conway said was after "15 minutes" but the station claimed had happened after 10 minutes. The rest of the time slot was the emergency procedure, a black screen with live organ music that had not been used in over 20 years. A WEWS spokesman claimed that the station's switchboard was "lit up" with protest calls, and general manager Donald Perris derided Turn-On as being "in excessive poor taste." Upon dropping the program, Perris sent to ABC president Elton Rule an angry telegram: "If your naughty little boys have to write dirty words on the walls, please don't use our walls. Turn-On is turned off, as far as WEWS is concerned."The Plain Dealer: "WEWS-TV Turns Off 'Turn On'", February 6, 1969, via Cleveland Classic Media's Facebook page. George Schlatter would later claim that Perris actively lobbied other affiliates prior to the broadcast to force a network cancellation after objecting to it replacing Peyton Place on the Wednesday night schedule. At the same time, WAKR-TV in Akron, Ohio—the Cleveland market's other primary ABC affiliate—did not drop the program nor receive any negative phone calls but their general manager criticized the show's "questionable taste".

After seeing the episode, several stations in the later western time zones decided not to broadcast the show at all, including Portland, Oregon's KATU, Seattle, Washington's KOMO-TV, and Denver, Colorado's KBTV, which stated: "We have decided, without hesitation, that it would be offensive to a major segment of the audience". Viewers of Little Rock, Arkansas's KATV, which disliked the show but decided to air it, "jam[med] the station's switchboard" with complaints. Dallas, Texas ABC affiliate WFAA elected to air the show on the following Sunday night at 10:30 local time, to an overwhelmingly negative response.

Both The New York Times and the Associated Press gave the show poor reviews. An ABC executive stated that "creatively, Turn-On didn't work". He compared the show negatively to the comedy of Dean Martin, Laugh-In, and the Smothers Brothers, which the executive described as "absolutely beyond belief ... awfully blue", but were popular and less controversial because unlike Turn-On, "they're funny". After Turn-Ons cancellation TV Guide called the show "The biggest bomb of the season". It stated that both CBS and NBC had rejected the show due to its perceived lack of quality, and that its sexual content was an important reason why viewers rejected the show. The magazine quoted a source who lamented Turn-Ons lack of a regular host or interlocutor: "(T)here wasn't any sort of identification with the audience -- just a bunch of strangers up there insulting everything you believe in."

Conway said in 2008 that Turn-On was "way ahead of its time. I'm not sure even if you saw it today that maybe that time has also passed." Bart Andrews, in his 1980 book The Worst TV Shows Ever, stated that Turn-On was actually quite close to the original concept for Laugh-In. "It wasn't that it was a bad show, it was that it was an awkward show," concluded author Harlan Ellison, a fan of counter-cultural comedy and a TV critic for the Los Angeles Free Press in 1969.

On February 7, ABC announced that Turn-On would go on hiatus. Instead of the scheduled February 12 episode, the ABC Wednesday Night Movie (The Oscar, itself an infamous flop) would start 30 minutes early. This announcement came after the following week's TV Guide went to press; it published a listing for the scheduled February 12 episode, which would have starred Robert Culp and then-wife France Nuyen as hosts. Finally, on February 10, the show was formally canceled. By this time, WEWS, KBTV, and KATV all told ABC that they would not air the show again; with several other affiliates having already turned it down, it no longer made financial sense to air it. ABC received 369 calls of complaint during the show and 20 calls that supported it; by comparison, the network received 1,800 protest calls several weeks earlier after preempting the Wednesday Night Movie for an address by President Richard Nixon introducing his cabinet appointees. Network officials told sponsor Bristol-Myers that the show was unacceptable and Bristol-Myers ordered Schlatter and Friendly to end production. Many assumed the show's title was itself an implicit reference to Timothy Leary's pro-drug maxim, "Turn on, tune in, drop out".

The network eventually replaced Turn On with a revival of The King Family Show. The controversy led ABC to reject a pilot written by Norman Lear, stating that the lead character was "foul-mouthed, and bigoted", out of fear that it might anger its affiliates again. CBS liked the pilot, picked it up as All in the Family, and began airing it during the 1970-71 midseason.

In 2002, Turn-On was ranked number 27 on TV Guide's 50 Worst TV Shows of All Time. What Were They Thinking?: The 100 Dumbest Events in Television History'' ranked it at number 25.

See also

 List of television series canceled after one episode
 List of television shows considered the worst

References

External links
 

American Broadcasting Company original programming
American television sketch shows
Television series canceled after one episode
Television controversies in the United States